The 2023 Hawaii Rainbow Warriors football team will represent the University of Hawaiʻi at Mānoa in the 2023 NCAA Division I FBS football season. Led by second-year coach Timmy Chang, the Rainbow Warriors will play their home games at the Clarence T. C. Ching Athletics Complex as members of the Mountain West Conference.

Previous season 

The Rainbow Warriors finished the 2022 season with an overall record of 3–10 (2–6 Mountain West), finishing fifth in the West Division.

Schedule 

Source:

Game summaries

at Vanderbilt

Stanford

Albany

at Oregon

New Mexico State

Air Force

San Diego State

San Jose State

at Nevada

at New Mexico

at UNLV

Colorado State

at Wyoming

References

Hawaii
Hawaii Rainbow Warriors football seasons
Hawaii Rainbow Warriors football